The Oxytelinae are a subfamily of the Staphylinidae, rove beetles.  There are about 20 genera and at least 320 described species in Oxytelinae.

Genera
These 20 genera belong to the subfamily Oxytelinae:

 Anotylus Thomson, 1859 i c g b
 Aploderus Stephens, 1833 i c g b
 Apocellus Erichson, 1839 i c g b
 Bledius Leach, 1819 i c g b
 Carpelimus Leach, 1819 i c g b
 Coprophilus Latreille, 1829 i c g b
 Deleaster Erichson, 1839 i c g b
 Dolichoxenus Engel & Chatzimanolis, 2009
 Euphanias Fairmaire & Laboulbène, 1856 g
 Jerozenia Herman, 2003
 Manda Blackwelder, 1952 i c g b
 Mitosynum Campbell, 1982 i c g b
 Neoxus Herman, 1970 i c g b
 Ochthephilus Mulsant & Rey, 1856 i c g b
 Oxytelus Gravenhorst, 1802 i c g b
 Planeustomus Jacquelin du Val, 1857 g
 Platystethus Mannerheim, 1830 i c g b
 Syntomium Curtiss, 1828 i c g b
 Teropalpus Solier, 1849 i c g
 Thinobius Kiesenwetter, 1844 i c g b
 Thinodromus Kraatz, 1857 i c g b
 Trogactus Sharp, 1887 i c g

Data sources: i = ITIS, c = Catalogue of Life, g = GBIF, b = Bugguide.net

References

External links

 
 

 
articles containing video clips
beetle subfamilies
beetles of North America